Greg Berg (born November 26, 1960) is an American voice actor, best known for his work in cartoons, video games and in films as a voice match for certain male Hollywood actors.

Filmography

Anime

Film

Television

Video games

Radio
 Rick Dees Morning Show L.A. and (Worldwide) Weekly Top 40 - John Revolting, others (20 year

References

External links
 
 Greg Berg at Voice Chasers

1960 births
Living people
American male voice actors
American male video game actors
American male radio actors
Place of birth missing (living people)